Penitentiary Chances is the third album released by rapper, Turk. It was released on April 27, 2004 through Koch Records and was produced by Ke'Noe, Virgil and Howard McToyer. Penitentiary Chances was released while Turk was in jail and is widely considered his strongest effort, however it was not as successful as his previous two albums, making it to #32 on the Top R&B/Hip-Hop Albums and #22 on the Top Independent Albums. This would mark his final album distributed by Koch Records.

Track listing
"Live from the Lab" (feat. Ke'Noe) - 1:32  
"Raw & Off the Chain"- 4:18  
"Doin My Thing" (feat. Ke'Noe) - 2:49  
"Killer"- 4:52  
"I'm a Dog"- 3:31  
"Do It for the Money"- 5:06  
"Life's a Gamble"- 4:00  
"You Put It Together" [Remix]- 4:13  
"Music Makes Me High" (feat. Lil' Man Steve)- 4:21  
"All I Got in This World" (feat. Ke'Noe)- 3:49  
"Heartache"- 4:10

2004 albums
E1 Music albums
Turk (rapper) albums